Jhajaira Estefanía Urresta Guzmán (born c.1992) is an Ecuadorian member of the National Assembly of Ecuador. She came to notice after she lost an eye during the 2019 Ecuadorian Protests against austerity.

Life 
Urresta was born in about 1992. She came to notice during the 2019 protests in Ecuador against austerity measures. She was in the street near her home in a peaceful protest. The protest was after a 3 p.m. curfew that had been imposed. She was hit by a tear gas container which caused substantial damage to her left eye. She was one of 15 people who lost eyes during the protests.

She became a member of the UNES party and she was elected to Ecuador's fourth National Assembly in 2021 to represent the Province of Pichincha.

In May 2022 she raised the question of the competency of the second vice-President of the assembly Yeseña Guamaní with the Legislative Administration Council and she requested a multi-party investigation into an alleged breach of duties.

In June 2022 Urresta was among the National Assembly members who proposed the replacement of President Guillermo Lasso because of alleged mismanagement. Forty-six other members supported the proposal including Vanessa Álava, Ana María Raffo, Patricia Mendoza, Victoria Desintonio, Viviana Veloz and Rosa Mayorga.

In 2022 she and fellow assembly member Peter Calo called for the impeachment of the Minister of the Interior, . They proposed that Carrillo did not handle the response to the strike correctly in June 2022.

References

1990s births
Living people
Members of the National Assembly (Ecuador)
Women members of the National Assembly (Ecuador)
21st-century Ecuadorian women politicians
21st-century Ecuadorian politicians